Yvette Adounvo Atekpe is a Ghanaian businesswoman who is currently the Regional Managing Director of Internet Solutions. As a former member of the National Communication Planning Committee, she helped draft Ghana's 1999 Communications Policy. She sits on several boards including Ghana Internet Service Providers Association (GISPA), Internet Solutions Ghana, Dimension Data West Africa and Internet Solutions Mozambique.

Education 
Atekpe had her secondary school education at the Holy Child School. She then continued at the University of Ghana where she graduated with a bachelor's degree in sociology. She holds an MBA in marketing, a CBA from the Ghana Institute of Management and Public Administration, and a PGD in Marketing of Services from the Maastricht School of Management in The Netherlands.

Career 
Atekpe is currently the Regional Managing Director of Internet Solutions, a position she has held since 2008.

Awards and Achievements 
She has received several awards, including:

 2008 Fellow of the African Leadership Initiative
 ICT Woman of the Year 2014 – Ghana Telcom Awards
 Industry Personality of the Year 2016 – Ghana Telecom Awards.
2017's top 25 Ghana ICT Leaders - Ghana Telecom Awards
 2017  Marketing Woman of the Year Award – Chartered Institute of Marketing Ghana

References

Living people
University of Ghana alumni
Ghana Institute of Management and Public Administration alumni
21st-century Ghanaian businesswomen
21st-century Ghanaian businesspeople
Year of birth missing (living people)